A Figure in Hiding is Volume 16 in the original The Hardy Boys Mystery Stories published by Grosset & Dunlap.

This book was written for the Stratemeyer Syndicate by Leslie McFarlane in 1937. Between 1959 and 1973 the first 38 volumes of this series were systematically revised as part of a project directed by Harriet Adams, Edward Stratemeyer's daughter. The original version of this book was rewritten in 1965 by James D. Lawrence resulting in two different stories with the same title

Plot summary (revised edition)

While leaving the baseball field the Hardy boys are approached by a blind peddler with a warning for their father Fenton Hardy.  Then the boys take their boat, the Sleuth out on Barmet Bay for a ride and to watch the testing of a new hydrofoil boat named the Sea Spook.  While admiring the new boat they almost have a collision with it, allowing them a reason to board the boat where they find a glass eye, presumably belonging to Mr. Lambert who was test driving the boat when the near collision happened.  When the boys try to track down Mr. Lambert he goes missing and Bill Braxton, the owner of the Sea Spook is attacked at his boathouse and the Spook is searched.  Meanwhile, Fenton Hardy examines the warning from Henry Zatta, the blind peddler (who is really only just blind in one eye but is pretending to be blind because he is undercover), and declares that it must be warning them to keep away from the Goggler Gang.  They then realize that Mr. Lambert is actually a hoodlum named Spotty Lemuel.

Their discussion is interrupted by an old man at the door named Zachary Mudge who is staying at Doc Grafton's Health Farm, a luxurious resort overlooking Barmet Bay.  Mr. Mudge tells them that he would like to purchase the Sea Spook.  The boys decide to go to pick up their girlfriends Callie and Iola from a movie at the Bijou but as they arrive they see a man wearing the disguise of the Goggler Gang running away with the cashbox. They catch the man but he escapes before the police arrive. Later, the boys travel up the river in the ‘’sleuth’’ to speak to Mrs. Lunberry, the owner of a Jeweled Siva which was recently stolen, on behalf of their father who is going to take on the case.  Upon returning they are summoned to Doc Grafton’s Health Farm by their chum Chet Morton, who has taken summer employment there.  During the course of their travels they keep seeing suspicious vehicles, specifically brand new greenTorpedo sedans. When they get to the health farm Chet tells them that he has learned that someone is going to kidnap them and leaves them in suspense until Callie and Iola arrive and Chet says that they are kidnapping them to go to a beach party. The clue about the green Torpedo leads them to Izmir Motors, owned by Malcolm Izmir.  The boys try to get to the door of Mr. Izmir’s house but are attacked by his guard dogs and have to climb a tree to escape. The butler finally comes outside and calls the dog and the Hardys get to talk to Malcolm Izmir, who says he has been receiving threatening notes. Upon returning home they find their house has been burglarized and their father's safe blown open and Aunt Gertude tied and gagged with a note that calls her a blabbermouth.

They learn from Chief Collig that the Bijou holdup man was actually Nick Cordoza, and that he had broken into Mr. Izmir’s house, but Mr. Izmir had refused to press charges.  The boys also learn from Mr. Mudge that the Izmir syndicate has gone broke.  They also suspect that Doc Grafton’s resort is actually a hideout for crooks who are getting plastic surgery to alter their looks, based on Chet’s report that he saw a mummy in an off-limits building on the Health Farm and their guess that Mr. Izmir is the head of the Goggler Gang because his name can be shortened to Mal I, which may mean ‘evil eye’.  Fenton Hardy goes undercover at the resort while Chet and the Hardy boys investigate by sneaking onto the Health Farm. They all end up captured by Spotty Lemuel and Rip Sinder. They are rescued when Chet calls the police, who arrest the villains and several other crooks  staying at the Health Farm.

Plot summary (original edition)
The boys (Frank, Joe, and Chet) go see a movie called "A Figure in Hiding" at the local Rialto Theater. After the film is over, the Rialto is robbed, with the thief getting away with $900. Then the boys go to the Bayport Hotel and meet up with their father, Fenton Hardy. They spy on a pair of men (Rip Sinder and Spotty Lemuel) in the room next door, part of a cruel gang called the "Eye Syndicate", run by a bogus doctor named Grafton performing fraudulent eye operations on unsuspecting victims. While Sinder and Lemuel are preparing letters to prospective victims, Sinder's daughter barges in and begs him to come home. Lemuel, trying to get her to leave, reveals to her that she was adopted, something that Sinder had kept secret from her. This works and Virginia runs away in a fit of despair and sorrow. Not long after that, the police mistakenly arrest their friend Chet for the robbery. It was really committed by Nick Cordoza, whom the boys found in his car unconscious. Chet runs away to Boston instead of going back home, following directions from a note supposedly from the Hardy boys to go there and wait for them. Later, their father devises a plan to trap Grafton by telling one of his clients (Henry Zatta) to pay with marked bills. However, the plan falls apart after   Grafton recognizes his long lost father, causing him to flee and leave behind the $500 in marked money. Eventually, the boys find Virginia at an auto garage, where they attempt to prevent her from escaping, only to be caught in an auto accident. Grafton and his mute assistant Zeb find them and attempt to bury them alive but the Hardy boys fight them off. The boys are able to make it out of Grafton's cellar and the police show up to arrest the criminals. When the case is solved, Virginia is reunited with her grandmother, one of the victims of Grafton's fraudulent medical operations.

References

The Hardy Boys books
1937 American novels
1937 children's books
1965 American novels
1965 children's books
Grosset & Dunlap books